The Rutherford AVA is an American Viticultural Area located within Napa Valley AVA and centered on the town of Rutherford, California.  The area is known for its unique terroir particularly with its Cabernet Sauvignon. The well-drained soil of this area is composition of gravel, loam and sand with volcanic deposits and marine sediments from the Franciscan Assemblage. The appellation accounts for only  in the center of Napa Valley but has been home to some of the regions most historic and world-renowned wineries such as Beaulieu Vineyards, Rutherford Hill, Raymond Vineyards, and Inglenook Winery.

References

American Viticultural Areas of the San Francisco Bay Area
Napa Valley
Geography of Napa County, California
1993 establishments in California
American Viticultural Areas